Joseph "Chick" Finney ( – December 11, 1975) was an American jazz pianist, composer, and businessman known for his work with Miles Davis.

Early life 
Finney was a native of St. Louis and attended Vashon High School. He became interested in piano after seeing Duke Ellington perform at the St. Louis Coliseum and later purchased sheet music to begin self-study. Finney also took lessons with J. Roy Terry, a professor of music.

Career 
Finney worked as a background pianist for the St. Louis Crackerjacks in 1933 and 1934. Finney later performed with Miles Davis. He also wrote and arranged music for Tuba Skinny and Hot Lips Page. Finney later started a public relations firm and was a columnist for the St. Louis Argus. He later produced a regional talent show called Stars of Tomorrow.

References 

1910s births
1975 deaths

Year of birth uncertain
Musicians from St. Louis
Jazz musicians from Missouri
American jazz pianists